Feel the Rage is an EP released by heavy metal band Galactic Cowboys.

Notes
The artwork is a painting by bassist Monty Colvin.
A new song "Paradigm Shift" is the second track on this EP, while the title track originally appeared on the Machine Fish album. 
This EP contains two covers; "I Want You" by KISS, and "Junior's Farm" by Wings.
The original versions of the two live tracks, "Idle Minds" and "9th Of June", can be found on the Machine Fish album.
The un-listed track, dubbed "Grandmother's Closet", is a short bluegrass song written during the Machine Fish sessions.

Track listing
"Feel The Rage" (Colvin, Huggins)
"Paradigm Shift" (Colvin, Huggins, Doss)
"I Want You" (Paul Stanley)
"Junior's Farm" (Paul McCartney, Linda McCartney)
"Idle Minds" (Live) (Huggins, Colvin, Doss)
"9th Of June" (Live) (Colvin)
"Grandmother's Closet" (Galactic Cowboys)

Personnel

Ben Huggins - Vocals, guitar
Wally Farkas - Guitar, vocals, keys
Monty Colvin - Bass, vocals 
Alan Doss - Drums, vocals, keys

References

External links
Feel The Rage lyrics

1996 EPs
Galactic Cowboys albums